John Casali is a British-American sound engineer. He won an Academy Award in the category Best Sound for the film Bohemian Rhapsody.

References

External links 

Living people
Place of birth missing (living people)
Year of birth missing (living people)
British audio engineers
20th-century British engineers
21st-century British engineers
American audio engineers
20th-century American engineers
21st-century American engineers
Best Sound Mixing Academy Award winners
British emigrants to the United States
Best Sound BAFTA Award winners